The 2017–18 New York Islanders season was the 46th season in the franchise's history. It was their third season in the Barclays Center in the New York City borough of Brooklyn, which they moved into after leaving Nassau Coliseum in Nassau County on Long Island at the conclusion of the 2014–15 season. The Islanders missed the playoffs for the second consecutive season.

Standings

Divisional standings

Conference standings

Schedule and results

Preseason
The Islanders released their preseason schedule on June 15, 2017.

Regular season
The Islanders published their regular season schedule on June 22, 2017.

Player statistics
As of April 7, 2018

Skaters

Goaltenders

Transactions
The Islanders have been involved in the following transactions during the 2017–18 season.

Trades

Notes:
 This trade ensured that the Vegas Golden Knights would select Jean-Francois Berube in the 2017 NHL Expansion Draft.

Free agents acquired

Free agents lost

Claimed via waivers

Lost via waivers

Players released

Lost via retirement

Player signings

Draft picks

Below are the List of New York Islanders draft picks' selections at the 2017 NHL Entry Draft, which was held on June 23 and 24, 2017, at the United Center in Chicago, Illinois.

Notes:
 The Los Angeles Kings' sixth-round pick went to the New York Islanders as the result of a trade on June 24, 2017, that sent a sixth-round pick in 2018 to Los Angeles in exchange for this pick.

References

New York Islanders seasons
New York Islanders
New York Islanders
New York Islanders
New York Islanders
2010s in Brooklyn
Prospect Heights, Brooklyn